Brigadier-General Julian McCarty Steele   (c. 1870 – 13 March 1926) was a 
British Army officer who briefly commanded the 7th Infantry Division during the First World War.

Military career
Educated at the Royal Military College, Sandhurst, Steele was commissioned into the Coldstream Guards on 29 October 1890. He saw served as adjutant of his regiment in the late 1890s, saw action in the Second Boer War and then commanded the 22nd Brigade during the First World War. He was appointed a Companion of the Order of the Bath in the 1918 New Year Honours and briefly commanded the 7th Division in Italy between 9 February 1918 and 22 March 1918. After the war he served as commander of the 1st Guards Brigade at Aldershot Garrison from 1920 to 1924.

References

1870 births
1926 deaths
British Army personnel of the Second Boer War
Graduates of the Royal Military College, Sandhurst
British Army generals of World War I
Companions of the Order of the Bath
Companions of the Distinguished Service Order
Companions of the Order of St Michael and St George